Ellipsidion australe, or the eastern ellipsidion, or bush cockroach, is a harmless species of cockroach native Australia and found in New South Wales, the Northern Territory, Queensland, and Victoria. The species was first described in 1863 as Thyrsocera australis by Henri de Saussure.

Gallery

References

Cockroaches
Insects of Australia
Insects described in 1863